The Real Testament is the major-label debut album by rapper Plies. It was released on August 7, 2007.  Upon its release, the album was well received by music critics.

On January 31, 2020, Plies released a sequel album, The Real Testament II, which was also his fifth studio album.

History

The album features guest appearances by Akon, Tank, and T-Pain. The first single "Shawty", released on July 10, 2007, features T-Pain and was produced by Drumma Boy and Ensayne.

The second single "Hypnotized" features and was produced by Akon.

There was also a series of web-only singles "100 Years", "Running My Momma Crazy", and "Got Em Hatin", there is a video for each of them, most of them were released in October and November, 2007. The third single was scheduled to be "You", featuring Tank, but it was changed to "I Am the Club".

The album was released in five different versions which included different bonus features depending on where the buyer purchases the album from.

The album was originally titled The Real Nigga Bible but was changed to The Real Testament for business reasons. The original cover showed Plies with a cigar filled with marijuana in his mouth, but was edited for certain retail outlets.
An instrumental version of the album was released on iTunes on September 25.

Critical reception

AllMusic editor David Jeffries said that the album had a few "redundant tracks and some potential unreached", but praised both studio and street tracks being supported by capable producers and guest artists throughout. He concluding with: "An energetic artist with little refinement, Plies puts his rough edges to good use on The Real Testament, an exciting, sometimes promising, debut." Steve 'Flash' Juon of RapReviews spoke about the record: "In lesser hands this would have been one of a hundred no-name rap albums that end up in your local store's bargain bin but thanks to good beats and well-chosen singles in The Real Testament, Plies makes a favorable impression both on radio and his CD. So long as he avoids any more unfortunate nightclub incidents Plies has a promising future ahead that doesn't involve '100 Years' behind bars."

Chart performance
The Real Testament sold 96,000 copies in its first week of release, debuting at number two on the Billboard 200. The following week the album dropped seven spots to number nine. In its third week, the album sold 27,000 copies, dropping from number nine to twenty one. As of April 8, 2019, The Real Testament has been certified Platinum by the Recording Industry Association of America.

Track listing

Sample credits
"Shawty" - Contains a sample of "Fantasy" by Earth, Wind & Fire

Chart positions

Weekly charts

Year-end charts

Certifications

References

2007 debut albums
Albums produced by J. R. Rotem
Albums produced by Drumma Boy
Albums produced by Maejor
Atlantic Records albums
Plies (rapper) albums
Albums produced by Akon